Marina Georgieva (born 13 April 1997) is an Austrian professional footballer who plays as a defender for Division 1 Féminine club Paris Saint-Germain and the Austria national team.

Club career
Georgieva began her career at FK Hainburg. In 2012 she moved to SKN St. Pölten, that were just promoted to the ÖFB-Frauenliga. In St. Pölten, she won the championship in 2015 and 2016 and also won the Austrian Cup three times.

In January 2017, Georgieva joined German club Turbine Potsdam. In June 2018, she moved to SC Sand.

On 11 August 2022, French club Paris Saint-Germain announced the signing of Georgieva on a two-year deal until June 2024.

International career
Georgieva was part of the Austrian U-17 national team that competed at the 2014 UEFA Women's Under-17 Championship in England. She was also part of the Austrian U-19 national team that represented Austria at the 2016 UEFA Women's Under-19 Championship in Slovakia. In 2017, Georgieva was part of the 23-woman squad that represented Austria and reached the semi-finals at the UEFA Women's Euro.

Personal life
Born in Austria, Georgieva is of Bulgarian descent.

Career statistics

International

References

External links

Player's Profile at Soccerdonna

1997 births
Living people
People from Melk
Footballers from Lower Austria
Austrian people of Bulgarian descent
Women's association football defenders
Austrian women's footballers
Austria women's international footballers
FSK St. Pölten-Spratzern players
1. FFC Turbine Potsdam players
SC Sand players
Paris Saint-Germain Féminine players
ÖFB-Frauenliga players
Frauen-Bundesliga players
2. Frauen-Bundesliga players
Austrian expatriate women's footballers
Austrian expatriate sportspeople in Germany
Austrian expatriate sportspeople in France
Expatriate women's footballers in Germany
Expatriate women's footballers in France
UEFA Women's Euro 2017 players